Lake Vyrnwy (or ) is a reservoir in Powys, Wales, built in the 1880s for Liverpool Corporation Waterworks to supply Liverpool with fresh water. It flooded the head of the Vyrnwy valley and submerged the village of Llanwddyn.

The Lake Vyrnwy Nature Reserve and Estate that surrounds the lake is jointly managed by the Royal Society for the Protection of Birds (RSPB) and Hafren Dyfrdwy and is a popular destination for ornithologists, cyclists and hikers. The reserve is designated as a national nature reserve, a Site of Special Scientific Interest, a Special Protection Area, and a Special Area of Conservation.

Geography
Lake Vyrnwy is a reservoir in Powys, Wales, created in 1888 by flooding the head of the river Vyrnwy valley. 
The river flows from the dam into Shropshire where it converges with the River Severn near the village of Melverley on the Welsh border and outflows into the Bristol Channel.

311 brooks, waterfalls and rivers flow into the lake and are named after the mountains or hillsides they flow from. The main ones, clockwise from the west side of the dam, are named Afon Hirddu, Eunant, Afon Eiddew, Afon Naedroedd, Afon Cedig and Afon Y Dolau Gwynionew.

On the northern edge of the lake is a small hamlet called Rhiwargor where the rivers Afon Eiddew and Afon Naedroedd meet. Up the valley of Afon Eiddew is a waterfall known locally as Pistyll Rhyd-y-meincau, commonly known as Rhiwargor waterfall.

Construction

In 1879, George Deacon was instructed to prepare the parliamentary plans for the Vyrnwy Dam. The valley was chosen because of its size, favourable geology and its source, the River Vyrnwy, having a large water catchment area.

Thomas Hawksley was appointed as engineer-in-chief and prepared the design for a stone dam.  Dam construction with great blocks of Welsh slate started in 1881 and was completed in 1888. Hawksley resigned in 1885 because of a conflict with George Deacon who was appointed as joint engineer. The dam was the first large stone-built dam in the United Kingdom and cost £620,000 (equivalent to £ million in ). Earlier dams in Britain had been built using great earth embankments to hold back the water. In 1889, shortly after completion, the lake was stocked with 400,000 Loch Leven trout.

Between 1881 and 1892 the aqueducts carrying water to Liverpool were constructed.

Construction of the dam flooded the village of Llanwddyn. The residents of the village were not consulted about the proposal for a dam and opposed the plan. Their relocation involved the demolition of a church, two chapels, three inns, ten farmhouses, and 37 houses. A new settlement to house them was built lower down the valley by Liverpool Corporation.

Description 
The dam was the first to be constructed with drainage tunnels designed to prevent a build up of pressure beneath the base. It is listed as a Grade I historic building by Cadw.

The dam was the first to carry water over its crest instead of in a channel at the side. At the bottom of the dam is a body of water known as a stilling basin  necessary to absorb the energy when the water flows over the crest and into the valley, and to stop the water eroding the foundations of the dam.

A power house located under the west tower contains an electrical generator driven by water leaving the reservoir. Before mains electricity arrived in the 1960s this was the area's only source of power.

About  from the dam is the reservoir's straining tower. Standing only  from the shore, its purpose is to filter or strain out material in the water with a fine metal mesh, before the water flows along the aqueduct to Liverpool. Its architecture represents Gothic revival, built at the same time as the dam.

The west and east towers release compensation water into the River Vyrnwy through huge valves; the river would dry up unless a minimum flow was maintained. The flow is measured by Natural Resources Wales at a weir a few hundred metres downstream.

Water supply

19th century
The water from Lake Vyrnwy is carried  in the Vyrnwy Large Diameter Trunk Main (LDTM) aqueduct which originally consisted of two pipelines, made largely of cast iron. To help maintenance work on the  diameter cast-iron tunnel which took the aqueduct under the Mersey, riveted steel piping was also used, which was to become the norm for trunk water-main piping.

The aqueducts cross the valley floor near Penybontfawr and then runs north of Llanrhaeadr-ym-Mochnant and Efail-rhyd on the north-east of the Tanat Valley. The aqueducts are largely underground although there are some visible surface features including air valves, the Cileos valve house, the Parc-uchaf balancing reservoirs, and a deep cutting to the west of Llanrhaeadr-ym-Mochnant.

Brick and concrete-lined tunnels carried pipes at Hirnant, Cynynion and Llanforda, and a fourth was later added at Aber, so that the Hirnant tunnel could be made accessible for maintenance.

20th century
From 1926 to 1938 the first section of a third pipeline was laid using bituminous-coated steel. in 1946, a fourth pipeline was added south of Oswestry to increase capacity to 227 million litres per day.

In 1978–81, the pipe crossings beneath the Mersey and the Manchester Ship Canal were reorganised. 
After privatisation of the water companies, responsibility for the Vyrnwy Dam and associated structures fell to Severn Trent Water, and since 2018 to its subsidiary company Hafren Dyfrdwy. 
The rights to the water abstraction are with United Utilities for drinking water supply to Liverpool.

21st century
In 2013, United Utilities commenced a major refurbishment of the entire  of the LDTM aqueduct, which was scheduled for completion in 2020.

Nature reserve and conservation

Lake Vyrnwy is a designated Nature Reserve. The RSPB has several bird hides around the lake, where a number of rare species of birds are known to be breeding, including the peregrine falcon, the pied flycatcher, the common redstart, the Eurasian siskin and the wood warbler. Every spring they host a dawn chorus tour.

Around 90 species of bird have been recorded as breeding on the reserve, and six species of bat, including the pipistrelle and brown long-eared bat. Butterfly species include purple hairstreaks, commas and peacocks. Dragonflies include golden ringed, common hawker and four spotted chaser.

Managing the moorland helps improve the habitat for red grouse and the short-eared owl.
Heather moorland which grows on the mountains around the lake is now being restored. In the past, heather was burnt, cut and the seeds collected to be sowed where the heather has gone. Burning at the Lake Vyrnwy moorland is no longer carried out, as the burning can have negative consequences for water management, namely water colouration.

Sheep, cattle and ponies also graze on the heather, managed by tenant farmers who farm the moorland in accordance with organic agriculture.

Broadleaf trees are being planted to replace coniferous trees, and man-made features such as hedgerows and dry-stone walls are also being restored, and wildflower areas are being restored to help insects, birds and other wildlife.

Tourism

Wood sculpture
Llanwddyn has had since 1995 a sculpture park in the valley below the dam, containing many wooden carved works. There are large wooden picnic benches in the shape of leaves and trees on the west side of the lake at Llechwedd Ddu. Near the old village on the beach is a sculpture of dolphins which, when the lake rises in a flood, appear to be jumping out of the water. Several totems are carved into standing trees and re-erected fallen trunks.

Recreation
Activities in the area include sailing, hiking on Glyndŵr's Way, rock climbing, cycling, walking and horse riding. The Lake Vyrnwy Half Marathon is conducted annually.

Tallest tree
This was damaged in stormy weather during the winter of 2010-2011 and had to be felled at 124 years old in March 2011.

References

External links
Lake Vyrnwy Nature Reserve
Lake Vyrnwy on the Powys Digital History Project
Abandoned communities: Llanwddyn
Lake Vyrnwy Cycle Route

Llanwddyn
Vyrnwy
Royal Society for the Protection of Birds reserves in Wales
LVyrnwy
Dams completed in 1888
1888 in Wales